Steven, Stephen, or Steve Campbell may refer to:

Steven Campbell (artist) (1953–2007), Scottish artist
Steven Campbell (footballer) (born 1986), Australian footballer
Stephen Campbell Moore (born 1979), English actor
Stevie Campbell (born 1967), Scottish footballer
Steve Campbell (American football), American college football head coach
Steve Campbell (tennis) (born 1970), American tennis player
Steve Campbell (snooker player) (born 1966), English snooker player